Prince Vladimir Nikolayevich Orlov (Dec. 31, 1868-Aug. 29, 1927), part of the Orlov family, was one of Tsar Nicholas II's closest advisors, and between 1906 and 1915 headed the Tsar's military cabinet.

Biography

Orlov, who bore the nickname "Fat Orlov", may have introduced to the Tsar the motorcar in 1903, and was married to Olga, a daughter of Prince Constantine Esperovich Beloselsky-Belozersky. His son Prince Nicholas Vladimirovich Orlov (1891–1961) wed in 1917 Nadezhda Petrovna Romanov Orloff. Orlov competed in the 1900 Summer Olympics, in equestrian events.

Patron of engineers

As the head of the military cabinet, Orlov was a keen technologist interested in military applications of the motor car. He was the patron of Adolphe Kégresse, the brilliant mechanical engineer responsible for the Kégresse track. Orlov wrote in a letter to the Tsar on 15 May 1914:

Indeed, Kégresse continued as Head of the Mechanical Department of the Russian Imperial Garage at Tsarskoye Selo until the fall of the Romanovs caused him to flee to his homeland.

Fall over Rasputin
Orlov continued his military duties until he was banished by the Tsar in 1915 to the Caucasus after losing the struggle for power to Rasputin.  On August 19, 1915, after an unsuccessful attempt to discredit Rasputin and the Tsarina in a newspaper he and Vladimir Dzhunkovsky, First Deputy Interior Minister, were discharged from their posts, and four days later, the Tsar took supreme command of the Russian armies fighting on the Eastern Front of the First World War. As London Times correspondent Robert Wilton put it,

In exile
Orlov, exiled by events subsequent to the Russian revolution of 1917 and settled in Paris. Orlov died in Samois-sur-Seine and is  buried in Paris, France.

References

External links

1868 births
1927 deaths
People of the Russian Revolution
Russian people of World War I
19th-century people from the Russian Empire
20th-century Russian people
Nicholas II of Russia
Politicians of the Russian Empire
Cabinet ministers of the Russian Empire
Russian princes
Russian anti-communists
Emigrants from the Russian Empire to France
Russian male equestrians
Olympic equestrians of Russia
Equestrians at the 1900 Summer Olympics